Luke McCabe (born 10 August 1976) is a former Australian rules footballer who played with Hawthorn in the Australian Football League (AFL) and Central District in the South Australian National Football League (SANFL).

McCabe was a small defender who usually played in the back pockets. He was recruited by Hawthorn at pick 15 in the 1993 National Draft but took a while to establish himself in the team, playing over 20 games in a season for the first time in 1998. He finished that season with a second placing in Hawthorn's best and fairest awards and the following season was a member of their pre season premiership side. 

He is remembered for his participation in one of the "memorable moments" between Hawthorn and Melbourne when, in round 1, 2002, he was on the receiving end of a mighty hip and shoulder from David Neitz on his way to snap an inspirational goal.

McCabe returned to Central District for the 2005 SANFL season and was an integral part of the Bulldogs winning their third consecutive premiership. McCabe was awarded the Jack Oatey Medal for being the best on ground in the Grand Final. He retired from senior football following the end of the 2006 season due to work commitments. However, McCabe returned to Central District for the 2008 season.

References

External links

Profile at Hawksheadquarters

1976 births
Living people
Australian rules footballers from South Australia
Hawthorn Football Club players
Central District Football Club players
People educated at Sacred Heart College, Adelaide